The Malabar Independent Syrian Church (MISC) also known as the Thozhiyur Church, is a Christian church centred in Kerala, India. It is one of the churches of the Saint Thomas Christian community, which traces its origins to the evangelical activity of Thomas the Apostle in the 1st century.

This group split off from the main body of India's Malankara Church in 1772 and was confirmed as an independent church with its current name after a high court verdict in 1862. Although the church is independent under the Malankara umbrella, the church faith and traditions are strictly Oriental Orthodox, adhering to the West Syriac Rite and consistently using western Syriac and Malayalam during the Holy Qurbono (Qurbono Qadisho). The Eucharistic Celebration is popularly known as Holy Qurbana due to the historical influence of the Church of the East.

The church has about 5,000 members.

History

The Saint Thomas Christians trace their origins to Thomas the Apostle, who according to tradition proselytized in India in the 1st century. By the 7th century they were part of the Church of the East, centred in Persia. The entire community remained united until the 17th century, when disputes with the Portuguese padroado in India led to the Coonan Cross Oath of 1653 and the division of the Saint Thomas Christians into Syro-Malabar Church and independent branches. The independent branch, known as the Malankara Church, forged a relationship with the Syriac Orthodox Church of Antioch.

However, relations between the Syriac Orthodox hierarchy and the native clergy were sometimes strained. In 1772 Bishop Gregorios, a representative of the Syriac Orthodox hierarchy from the Middle East, had grown dissatisfied with how the Metropolitan Dionysius I had treated him. Against Dionysius' wishes, Gregorios consecrated as bishop a leading dissenter, the monk Kattumangatt Kurien, in a secret but canonically legitimate ceremony. The new bishop took the name Cyril (Koorilos), and he was designated Gregorios' sole heir.

Cyril claimed authority over the parishes of Cochin, and initially received the support of the Raja of Cochin. However, Dionysus saw him as a threat to his power, and in 1774 he appealed to the Raja and to the British authorities in India to suppress the rival bishop. Cyril left for Thozhiyoor, Kerala outside their jurisdiction, and established what would become an independent church. This was the first of several groups to split from the Malankara Church.

Cyril's church was always small, but maintained stability by attracting devoted priests and emphasizing regularity in the ecclesiastical order. In 1794 Cyril consecrated his brother Geevarghese as bishop; Geevarghese succeeded Cyril as Cyril II in 1802, and the succession has proceeded unbroken since.

As a result of an 1862 court case, the Madras High Court confirmed the Thozhiyur church was an independent Malankara church, and it has subsequently been known as the Malabar Independent Syrian Church.

Ecumenical relations

The Malabar Independent Syrian Church maintains good relations with the other Malankara churches especially its relationship with Marthoma Syrian church. Despite its small size, it has had a significant impact on the history of the Saint Thomas Christian community. On several occasions Thoziyur bishops have stepped in to consecrate bishops for the other churches when the episcopal succession, and therefore the churches themselves, were in danger. Philoxenos II Kidangan (1811–1829) of the Thozhiyur Church consecrated three successive bishops in the unified Malankara Church: Dionysius II on 22 March 1816, Dionysius III on 19 October 1817, and *Dionysius IV on 27 August 1825. In 1894 Athanasius and Koorilose V consecrated Titus I Mar Thoma for the Reformed Syrians, later known as the Mar Thoma Church. On subsequent occasions when the Thozhiyur Metropolitan has died without consecrating a successor, the Metropolitan and bishops of the Mar Thoma Church had performed the consecration. Thozhiyur bishops have taken part in all Mar Thoma Church episcopal ordinations up to the present.

Malabar Independent Syrian Church is a member of the Christian Conference of Asia, the Council of Churches in India, and the Kerala Council of Churches. Other ecumenical links have been developed, not least with the Anglican and Lutheran Churches. This has been facilitated through a support group based in England, which is a registered charitable trust. In 1998 and 2008, Thozhiyur Church Metropolitans were ecumenical observers at the Lambeth Conference of Anglican bishops. In July 2006 Koorilose IX and Basilios I participated as co-consecrators in the episcopal ordination of Paul Hunt and John Fenwick as bishops of the Free Church of England.

Thozhiyur Metropolitans
The Metropolitans of the Malabar Independent Syrian Church:

 H.H Mor Coorilose Abraham (1772-1802)
 H.H Mor Coorilose Ghevarghese - I (1802-1808)
H.G Mor Ivanios Joseph -  Suffragon Metropolitan (1807) (6 months only)
H.B Mor Philexinos Zacharias (1807-1811)
H.B Mor Philexinos Ghevarghese - Malankara Metropolitan (1811-1829)
H.B Mor Coorilose Ghevarghese - II (1829-1856)
H.B Mor Coorilose Joseph - I (1856-1888)
H.B Mor Athanasius Joseph (1888-1898)
H.B Mor Coorilose Ghevarghese - III(1898-1935)
H.G Mor Athanasius Paulose - Suffragon Metropolitan (1917-1927)
H.B Mor Coorilose Kuriakose (1936-1947)
H.B Mor Coorilose Ghevarghese - IV (1948-1967)
H.B Mor Philexinos Paulose (1967-1977) (joined the Syro-Malankara Catholic Church and replaced)
H.B Mor Coorilose Mathews (1978-1986)
H.B Mor Coorilose Joseph - II (1986-2001)
H.B Mor Baselius Cyril (2001–present)

See also
 Malankara Orthodox Syrian Church
 Jacobite Syrian Christian Church
 Syriac Orthodox Church
 Malankara Mar Thoma Syrian Church (Mar Thoma Church)

Notes

References
 
 
 
 
 
 Vadakkekara, Benedict (2007). Origin of Christianity in India: a Historiographical Critique. Media House Delhi.

Further reading
 

The following are works in Malayalam:
Mathew, N.M. (2007) Malankara Marthoma Sabha Charitram, (History of the Marthoma Church), Volume 1.(2006) and Volume II (2007). Pub. E.J.Institute, Thiruvalla.
Kochumon, M.P. (1995) Parisuddha Kattumangatte Bavamar. (The saintly bishops of Kattumangattu). Pub. By Most Rev.Joseph Mar Koorilose Metropolitan.
Porkulam, A.K.C. (2003) Parisudha Kattumangatte Bavamar Thiruvachanathiludey. (St. Kattumangattu bishops through the Bible), Trissur.
Varughese, Rev. K.C. (1972) Malabar Swathantra Suryani Sabhyude Charitram (History of the Malankar Independednt Suryani Church).

External links
 Official website
 Malabar Independent Syrian Church
 Thozhiyur at indianchristianity.org
 The Church of Thozhiyoor / Anjoor

Saint Thomas Christians
Oriental Orthodoxy in India
Religious organizations established in 1772
Christian denominations established in the 18th century
1772 establishments in India